Ciolacu Nou is a commune in Fălești District, Moldova. It is composed of five villages: Ciolacu Nou, Ciolacu Vechi, Făgădău, Pocrovca and Șoltoaia.

References

Communes of Fălești District